Kuwaiti Women's League was founded in 2017 organized by Kuwait Football Association as the First official Women's Championship in the Country, Set to be played 2019-20 or after as teams start to be organized and play Before kickoff.

Teams
teams Confirmed:
Al-Qurain SC
AUM
 Fumes 
 Waves
Al-Fatat SC
 Jags
Salwa Alsabah SC

See also
 AFC Women's Club Championship

References

External links
Kuwait: VIVA Premier League Fixtures and Results at FIFA
xscores.com Kuwait Premier League
goalzz.com - Kuwaiti League

Kuwait Premier League
1
Kuwait
Sports leagues established in 2017
1
2017 establishments in Kuwait